The Unexplained Files is a 2010s American television series, airing on Science Channel, which investigates Paranormal and other unexplained phenomena.

This was the highest-rated series on Science during its first season in 2013. The second season began July 29, 2014 and has 12 episodes planned.

Criticism 
New York Times critic Neil Genzlinger criticized the show as covering a subject that has "long been overworked, and shows that examine the unexplained tend to focus on the same old esoteric mysteries rather than the practical ones right under our noses."

Episode list

Season 1 (2013 - 2014)

Season 2 (2014)

References

External links
 The Unexplained Files on IMDb
The Unexplained Files on the Science channel

Paranormal television
2013 American television series debuts